SenSys, the ACM Conference on Embedded Networked Sensor Systems, is an annual academic conference in the area of embedded networked sensors.

About SenSys

ACM SenSys is a selective, single-track forum for the presentation of research results on systems issues in the area of embedded networked sensors. The conference provides a venue to address the research challenges facing the design, deployment, use, and fundamental limits of these systems. Sensor networks require contributions from many fields, from wireless communication and networking, embedded systems and hardware, distributed systems, data management, and applications. SenSys welcomes cross-disciplinary work.

Ranking
Although there is no official ranking of academic conferences on wireless sensor networks, SenSys is widely regarded by researchers as one of the two (along with IPSN) most prestigious conferences focusing on sensor network research. SenSys focuses more on system issues while IPSN on algorithmic and theoretical considerations. The acceptance rate for 2017 was 17.2% (26 out of 151 papers accepted for publication).

SenSys Events
SenSys started in year 2003 and following is a list of SenSys events from 2003 to 2017:
 SenSys 2017, Delft, The Netherlands, November 5–8, 2017
 SenSys 2016, Stanford, CA, USA, November 14–16, 2016
 SenSys 2015, Seoul, South Korea, November 1–4, 2015
 SenSys 2014, Memphis, Tennessee, USA, November 3–6, 2014
 SenSys 2013, Rome, Italy, November 11–14, 2013
 SenSys 2012, Toronto, Canada, November 6–9, 2012
 SenSys 2011, Seattle, WA, USA, November 1–4, 2011
 SenSys 2010, Zurich, Switzerland, November 3–5, 2010
 SenSys 2009, Berkeley, California, USA, November 4–6, 2009
 SenSys 2008, Raleigh, North Carolina, USA, November 5–7, 2008
 SenSys 2007, Sydney, Australia, November 6–9, 2007
 SenSys 2006, Boulder, Colorado, USA, November 1–3, 2006
 SenSys 2005, San Diego, CA, USA, November 2–4, 2005
 SenSys 2004, Baltimore, MD, USA, November 3–5, 2004
 SenSys 2003, Los Angeles, California, USA, November 5–7, 2003

Sponsors
SenSys is sponsored by the following ACM Special Interest Groups:
SIGCOMM
SIGMOBILE
SIGARCH
SIGOPS
SIGMETRICS
SIGBED

See also
 Wireless sensor network

External links
 
 SenSys Bibliography (from DBLP)
 SenSys Proceedings (from ACM Digital Library)

Wireless sensor network
Computer networking conferences
Association for Computing Machinery conferences